Leopold Bros. is a family-owned and operated distillery located in Denver, Colorado. They are well known as an independent distillery that floor malts, mills, mashes, and ferments all the grains in their spirits, as well as distills, ages, and bottles their entire portfolio at their one and only distillery in northeast Denver. They currently have the largest traditional floor malting room of any distillery in the United States, where they malt Colorado barley onsite.

Leopold Bros distills over twenty hand-numbered, small-batch products, all made from scratch and natural ingredients, which are distributed in over twenty states, the District of Columbia, and parts of Europe. Among the distinctive methods used by Leopold Bros. is the separate distillation of each botanical used in flavoring its products prior to blending and final distillation. Many have won awards in international competitions.

History

Brothers Scott and Todd Leopold, opened a brewpub on South Main Street at the site of a renovated brake factory in Ann Arbor, Michigan in 1999. Later, operations expanded to include a micro-distillery. Todd Leopold, brew- and still-master for the brewery, after graduating from the Siebel Institute of Technology in Chicago, interned in four German breweries, and went to distilling school in Lexington, Kentucky. Scott Leopold, an environmental engineer, was crucial in the design stages attempting to create as near a zero-pollution factory as possible. The microbrewery operated as an "eco-brewery" using organic hops and barley, and used equipment and procedures designed to reduce wastewater and other waste by-products in the beer-making process.

Leopold Bros. closed its Ann Arbor location in the Spring of 2008, relocating to Denver, where it discontinued brewing and began operating as a micro-distillery alone. To keep up with exploding demand, Leopold Bros. opened a new facility with triple the production capacity of their previous facility, which also includes one of only a few malting floors at a distillery outside of Scotland. Many have won awards in international competitions They received Distillery of the Year award from the American Distilling Institute in 2015.

Spirits
 American Small-Batch Gin: Gold Medal, San Francisco World Spirits Competition
 Leopold's Summer Gin
 Navy Strength American Gin: Gold Medal, Beverage Tasting Institute; Winner, Good Food Awards
 Aperitivo
 Absinthe Verte: Silver Medal, 2008 London International Wine and Spirits Competition; Bronze Medal, 2009 San Francisco World Spirits Competition
 Fernet Leopold - Highland Amaro: Gold Medal, San Francisco World Spirits Competition
 Silver Tree American Small-Batch Vodka: Gold Medal, 2009 San Francisco World Spirits Competition; Silver Medal, 2007 San Francisco World Spirits Competition; Gold Medal, 2006 Beverage Tasting Institute
 Thomas & Leopold Single Barrel Dark Rum Discontinued
 Pisco (Gold Medal, 2009 San Francisco World Spirits Competition) Discontinued

Whiskies
 American Small Batch Whiskey
 Maryland-Style Rye Whiskey
 Rocky Mountain Blackberry Flavored Whiskey
 Rocky Mountain Peach Flavored Whiskey
 New York Apple Flavored Whiskey
 Michigan Cherry Whiskey
 Georgia Peach Flavored Whiskey

Liqueurs
 Rocky Mountain Blackberry: Gold Medal, 2006 Beverage Tasting Institute; Silver Medal, 2009 San Francisco World Spirits Competition
 New York Sour Apple: Gold Medal, 2007 Beverage Tasting Institute
 New England Cranberry: Best in Show, Fruit Liqueurs 2009 San Francisco World Spirits Competition; Gold Medal, 2007 Beverage Tasting Institute;
 French Press-Style American Coffee: Silver Medal, 2007 Beverage Tasting Institute; Silver Medal, 2007 San Francisco World Spirits Competition
 Rocky Mountain Peach: Gold Medal, 2007 Beverage Tasting Institute; Bronze Medal, 2007 San Francisco World Spirits Competition
 Michigan Tart Cherry: Gold Medal, 2007 Beverage Tasting Institute; Bronze Medal, 2009 San Francisco World Spirits Competition
 Three Pins Alpine Herbal: Gold Medal, 2007 Beverage Tasting Institute; Silver Medal, 2007 San Francisco World Spirits Competition; Bronze Medal, 2009 San Francisco World Spirits Competition
 American Orange Liqueur: Gold Medal, Beverage Tasting Institute
 Maraschino Liqueur: Winner, Good Food Awards

See also 
 malt house
 Peach Street Distillers

References

Further reading
 Tamarkin, David, "One for the road", Time Out Chicago Issue 156 (February 21–27, 2008)

External links
 Leopold Bros.

Manufacturing companies based in Denver
Distilleries in Colorado
Absinthe
Whiskies of the United States
American vodkas
American rums
Rums
Gins
Cuisine of the Western United States
Family-owned companies of the United States